K297BI (107.3 FM) is a radio station in St. Louis, Missouri, branded as "Classic 107.3" and owned and operated by the nonprofit Radio Arts Foundation–St. Louis. The station's studios are located in Clayton, Missouri.

The station is dedicated to the classical music format and its hosts include Kathy Lawton Brown, Tom Sudholt, and Julie Schuster.

Classical programming on K297BI is also broadcast on the HD Radio channel 96.3 WFUN-FM-HD2, also operated by the Radio Arts Foundation.

History

KFUO-FM 99.1, which had broadcast classical music to St. Louis since 1948, was owned by the Lutheran Church–Missouri Synod and became available for sale in 2009. In the name of the Radio Arts Foundation, Jim Connett, program director at KFUO, and Michael Neidorff, CEO of the Centene Corporation, made a purchase proposal for KFUO that was rejected by the synod board member and paid negotiator Kermit Brashear. The foundation immediately began plans for a new classical station, even before the Classic 99 format ceased analog operations and became available by webstream only.

KFUO was sold to Gateway Creative Broadcasting in March 2010, as approved by the Federal Communications Commission (FCC) in May. After announcing that the station would broadcast contemporary Christian music and be branded as Joy FM, Classic 99 ended its 62-year classical music format at 10 p.m. on July 6, 2010 after playing Beethoven's Ninth Symphony. St. Louis was without a full-time classical station from 2010 to 2013.

The Centene Charitable Foundation provided the Radio Arts Foundation a $1 million startup grant for the new station, and FCC Form 350 was filed for the translator station February 1, 2013, which was to be owned and operated by the Radio Arts Foundation–St. Louis, with Connett as general manager. Approval was announced March 7, 2013.

After a week of signal testing, RAF-STL Classical debuted on 107.3 K297BI and 96.3 KIHT-HD2 at 10 a.m. on April 8, 2013, with Beethoven's Ninth Symphony. Connett remarked, "This is truly a dream come true.... Building this new station from the ground up has been a labor of love."

The station features classical programming such as Exploring Music with Bill McGlaughlin, Concierto, and Classics 4 Kids. It obtained a significant music collection by partnering to download the libraries of KFUO and of WRR-FM, Dallas Classical 101.1.

On-air staff
An experienced staff of former KFUO Classic 99 employees and other radio industry professionals manage the day-to-day operations of RAF-STL.
Kathy Lawton Brown
Tom Sudholt
Julie Schuster

References

External links
Classic 107.3 official website

Radio stations established in 2013
297BI
Classical music radio stations in the United States
2013 establishments in Missouri